Fannettsburg is an unincorporated town in Metal Township, Franklin County, Pennsylvania, United States. 
Somewhat confusingly, it is located approximately six miles south of Fannett Township, although it was named for the township and was once part of it.

Fannettsburg was platted in 1790, and named after Fannett Township. A post office called Fannettsburg was established in 1809, the name was changed to Fannettsburgh in 1827, and name restored to Fannettsburg in 1892.

Vacant housing unit stats is misleading, as it includes a former campground that has vacant mobile homes. There are currently (2021) only two vacant homes in the main part of town.

References

Unincorporated communities in Franklin County, Pennsylvania